Crystal Pool Natatorium was a saltwater indoor swimming pool in Seattle, Washington. It was eventually adapted for use as Bethel Temple. It was designed by B. Marcus Priteca and built from 1915 to 1918. The pool was covered with boards and the venue used for boxing or roller skating.

The building was later demolished in 2003 and replaced with a condominium complex called Crystalla.

Description 

The complex was designed for C. D. Stimson by Marcus Priteca. Upon its debut, the Italian Renaissance architecture facility was described as having outdone the Baths of Rome. The total cost of its construction was approximately $200,000.

It had arched steel trusses and a glass roof. Its facade included terracotta features and it had a dome. Water was pumped in from the Puget Sound's Elliott Bay. The 260,000 gallon pool was heated. It was in the Belltown District.

History 
In 1918, the pool's adjoining energy plant was converted from burning oil to burning a form of powdered coal. A contemporaneous article in Electrical World magazine reported that it was to become the first of its kind (a small plant isolated from others) to transition to powdered coal. It received the coal by truck, and was described as not having a "slag pit" for its byproducts.

In February 1923 the Young Men's Republican Club of King County organized a Lincoln Banquet at the Crystal Pool Auditorium. In March 23, 1923 the Ku Klux Klan held a rally at the venue. At the time, Seattle was segregated with covenants to restrict where minorities could live and sundown restrictions keeping them out of white neighborhood after working hours. The Klan event was one of several held around Washington in 1923 and 1924.

In 1924, U. S. Navy swimmers from the battleships  and  competed at the pool.

William H. Offler bought the building in 1944 and converted it into Bethel Temple, permanently covering the pool with flooring. The entrance was on the corner of 2nd Avenue and Lenora Street.

Boxing
Crystal Pool was also used as a venue for boxing matches. Wooden planks and flooring were placed to cover the pool.  Boxer Leslie Earnest "Wildcat" Carter was photographed at the Crystal Pool. A match between Tony Seeman and Abie Israel was held at Crystal Pool on December 17, 1930. Promoter Nate Druxman organized fights at the venue where he established an athletic club. Hal Hoshino fought at the venue. Ken Overlin and Paul Delaney also fought at the venue.

Demolition and replacement
The building was razed on June 2003, and replaced with a 24-story condominium complex called Crystalla. Most of the original terracotta façade was preserved and rebuilt in place. A small glass dome calling back to the original one lost during the building's time as Bethel Temple was placed over the current building's corner entrance.

References

Demolished buildings and structures in Washington (state)
Swimming venues in the United States
Tourist attractions in Seattle
Sports venues completed in 1918
1918 establishments in Washington (state)